Lisa Tammy Rahming is a Bahamian Progressive Liberal Party politician, and attorney who has been serving as the Bahamian Minister of State for Social Services and Urban Development since 23 September 2021 and the Member of Parliament from Marathon since 6 October 2021. Rahming defeated FNM incumbent Romi Ferreira in the 2021 general election.

References 

Women government ministers of the Bahamas
Progressive Liberal Party politicians
21st-century Bahamian women politicians
21st-century Bahamian politicians
Members of the House of Assembly of the Bahamas
Living people

Year of birth missing (living people)